Alexander Tchigir (Aleksandr Chigir, born 6 November 1968 in Moscow) is a Russian and later German water polo player who competed in the 1992 Summer Olympics, in the 2004 Summer Olympics, and in the 2008 Summer Olympics.

See also
 Soviet Union men's Olympic water polo team records and statistics
 Germany men's Olympic water polo team records and statistics
 List of Olympic medalists in water polo (men)
 List of men's Olympic water polo tournament goalkeepers

References

External links
 

1968 births
Living people
Sportspeople from Moscow
Water polo goalkeepers
Soviet male water polo players
Russian male water polo players
German male water polo players
Olympic water polo players of the Unified Team
Olympic water polo players of Germany
Water polo players at the 1992 Summer Olympics
Water polo players at the 2004 Summer Olympics
Water polo players at the 2008 Summer Olympics
Olympic bronze medalists for the Unified Team
Olympic medalists in water polo
Medalists at the 1992 Summer Olympics